Sopubia is a genus of flowering plants belonging to the family Orobanchaceae.

Its native range is Tropical and Southern Africa, Madagascar, Southern China to Tropical Asia.

Species
Species:

Sopubia aemula 
Sopubia argentea 
Sopubia cana 
Sopubia comosa 
Sopubia conferta 
Sopubia decumbens 
Sopubia duvigneaudiana 
Sopubia elatior 
Sopubia eminii 
Sopubia gracilis 
Sopubia graminicola 
Sopubia kacondensis 
Sopubia karaguensis 
Sopubia lanata 
Sopubia lasiocarpa 
Sopubia latifolia 
Sopubia lemuriana 
Sopubia madagascariensis 
Sopubia mannii 
Sopubia matsumurae 
Sopubia menglianensis 
Sopubia myomboensis 
Sopubia parviflora 
Sopubia patris 
Sopubia ramosa 
Sopubia simplex 
Sopubia stricta 
Sopubia trifida 
Sopubia triphylla 
Sopubia ugandensis

References

Orobanchaceae
Orobanchaceae genera